The 2005 AFF U-20 Youth Championship was held in Palembang, Indonesia in August 2005.  That was the first edition of the tournament since its inception in 2002.  Ten nations took part with nine teams from the ASEAN region and one guest nation, the Maldives, from the South Asian region.

Participating nations

Tournament 
All times are Western Indonesia Time (WIB) - UTC+7

Group stage

Group A

Group B

Knockout stage

Bracket

Semi-finals

Third place play-off

Final

Winner

References 
AFF U-20 Youth Championship 2005 ASEAN Football Federation.

2005 in AFF football
2005
2005
2005 in youth association football